Acronneus bryanti is a species of tephritid or fruit flies in the genus Acronneus of the family Tephritidae.

Distribution
South Africa.

References

Tephritinae
Insects described in 1929
Diptera of Africa